The American Samoa women's national basketball team is the national basketball team of American Samoa.

See also
 American Samoa men's national basketball team
 American Samoa national under-19 basketball team
 American Samoa national under-17 basketball team
 American Samoa national 3x3 team

References

American Samoa Women's National Basketball Team

External links
American Samoa Basketball Association at Facebook

American Samoa
Basketball
Basketball
Women in American Samoa